Voyce is a surname. Notable people with the surname include:

 Edward Voyce (1633–1713), English clergyman
 Inez Voyce (1924–2022), American baseball player
 Julie Voyce (born 1957), Canadian artist
 Tom Voyce (born 1981), English rugby union player

See also
 Voce (surname)